This is a chronological list of Brockhampton's known live performances.

2017 shows

2018 shows

2019 shows

2020 shows

2022 shows

Notes

References

External links 

 

Lists of concert tours